Western Dreamer (foaled April 25, 1994 in Georgetown, Kentucky) is an American Standardbred racehorse who won the U. S. Pacing Triple Crown in 1997. Driven by Michel Lachance, his winning time of 1:51 1/5 in the Little Brown Jug  was the then fastest ever recorded for the race.

Western Dreamer is the only gelding of any breed to ever win a Triple Crown. Since July 2001 he has been a resident of the Hall of Champions at the Kentucky Horse Park.

References

1994 racehorse births
Cane Pace winners
American Standardbred racehorses
American Champion racehorses
Harness Horse of the Year winners
Dan Patch Award winners
Little Brown Jug winners
Messenger Stakes winners
Triple Crown of Harness Racing winners